U5 small nuclear ribonucleoprotein 200 kDa helicase is an enzyme that in humans is encoded by the SNRNP200 gene.

References

External links

Further reading

Spliceosome